The following highways are numbered 636:

Canada
New Brunswick Route 636
Saskatchewan Highway 636

United Kingdom
A636 road

United States